Sayyid Sa‘eed Akhtar Rizvi (1927–2002) was an Indian born, Twelver Shī‘ah scholar, who promoted Islam in East Africa. He was given authorizations by fourteen Grand Ayatullahs for riwayah, Qazawah, and Umur-e-Hasbiyah.

Biography
Rizvi was born in Ushri, Saran district, Bihar state, India, in 1927. His father was Sayyid Abul Hassan Rizvi and who was also a Hakim (Yunani medicine doctor) and a religious scholar. He had five sons and two daughters. His second eldest son, Sayyid Muhammad Rizvi, lives in Toronto, Ontario, Canada. He is the Imam of the Islamic Shia Ithna‘asheri Jamaat (ISIJ) of Toronto. He spoke and wrote in Urdu, English, Arabic, Persian, Swahili and was also familiar with Hindi and Gujarati.

In 1959 he was appointed the Islamic scholar for Lindi, Tanzania. In 1962, he conceived a plan for propagating Islam. His plan was proposed and approved at the triennial Conference of the Supreme Council of Africa Federation of K.S.I Jamaats of Africa in Tanga in 1964. and became the Bilal Muslim Mission. Rizvi was transferred from Arusha to Dar es Salaam in mid-eastern Tanzania and Bilal Muslim Mission of Tanzania was officially registered in 1968. The Bilal Muslim Mission of Kenya was founded in 1971. Through his mission he introduced correspondence courses in Islamic studies in English and Swahili. He traveled and lectured to university students in Africa, Europe, Canada and United States.

His funeral was held in Dar es Salaam with two scouts holding black flags in the cortege to the burial site. Officials and Scholars from several countries were present. The Islamic funeral prayer (Salat al-Mayyit) was given by his son, Muhammad Rizvi.

Rizvi authored over 140 books, some of them having been translated into many languages.

The Bilal Muslim Mission had been able to accomplished at lot in its objective of spreading the true teaching of Islam, through the hard work of its dedicated founders. This was achieved with very limited means and resources. Main source of spreading the true faith was person to person or through correspondence and publication of books and its dissemination. People from Guyana in South America to Poland in Europe and from Malaysia to West Africa benefitted and embraced the true Islam.

Bibliography

As author 

A History of the Shi’a People. Al-Maarif Foundation
Haja ya Dini. Bilal Muslim Mission of Tanzania
Understanding Karbala. Ansariyan Publications - Qum
Slavery - From Islamic and Christian Perspectives. Bilal Muslim Mission of Tanzania
Alcohol. WOFIS
Completion of Argument. Ansariyan Publication, Qum

As translator 

Al-Mizan An Exegesis of the Quran - Volume 1. WORLD ORGANIZATION FOR ISLAMIC SERVICES (WOFIS) 
Al-Mizan An Exegesis of the Quran - Volume 2. WORLD ORGANIZATION FOR ISLAMIC SERVICES (WOFIS) 
Al-Mizan An Exegesis of the Quran - Volume 3. WORLD ORGANIZATION FOR ISLAMIC SERVICES (WOFIS) 
Al-Mizan An Exegesis of the Quran - Volume 4. WORLD ORGANIZATION FOR ISLAMIC SERVICES (WOFIS) 
Al-Mizan An Exegesis of the Quran - Volume 5. WORLD ORGANIZATION FOR ISLAMIC SERVICES (WOFIS) 
Al-Mizan An Exegesis of the Quran - Volume 6. WORLD ORGANIZATION FOR ISLAMIC SERVICES (WOFIS) 
Al-Mizan An Exegesis of the Quran - Volume 7. WORLD ORGANIZATION FOR ISLAMIC SERVICES (WOFIS) 
Al-Mizan An Exegesis of the Quran - Volume 8. WORLD ORGANIZATION FOR ISLAMIC SERVICES (WOFIS) 
Al-Mizan An Exegesis of the Quran - Volume 9. WORLD ORGANIZATION FOR ISLAMIC SERVICES (WOFIS) 
Al-Mizan An Exegesis of the Quran - Volume 10. WORLD ORGANIZATION FOR ISLAMIC SERVICES (WOFIS) 
Al-Mizan An Exegesis of the Quran - Volume 11. WORLD ORGANIZATION FOR ISLAMIC SERVICES (WOFIS) 
Al-Mizan An Exegesis of the Quran - Volume 12. WORLD ORGANIZATION FOR ISLAMIC SERVICES (WOFIS) 
Al-Mizan An Exegesis of the Quran - Volume 13. WORLD ORGANIZATION FOR ISLAMIC SERVICES (WOFIS)

As editor 

 The Light. - Bi Monthly English Magazine first started in 1963. Bilal Muslim Mission of Tanzania

Journal articles

See also
Rizvi
List of Islamic scholars 
Bilal Muslim Mission of Tanzania

Suggested reading
 Outline of Shi'a Ithna-ashari History in East Africa by Marhum Mulla Asgharali M.M. Jaffer

References

External links
Biography Playandlearn
List of books by Sayyid Sa'eed Akhtar Rizvi

1927 births
2002 deaths
People from Saran district
Shia scholars of Islam
Indian Shia Muslims
Muslim missionaries
Indian emigrants to Tanzania